, abbreviated as N'EX, is a limited express train service operated in Japan since 1991 by East Japan Railway Company (JR East), serving Narita International Airport from various Greater Tokyo Area stations. Services run approximately half-hourly in the mornings and evenings, and hourly through the middle of the day. The main competition for the Narita Express is Keisei Electric Railway's Skyliner.

Trains and destinations

Narita Express trains serve various stations in the Greater Tokyo Area. Trains are formed of dedicated E259 series 6-car EMU sets, with all trains passing through Tokyo Station, where services are coupled or uncoupled. On the return journey, the reverse is true.

The majority of Narita Express services do not stop between Tokyo and Narita Airport Terminal 2·3 Station. The average time between Tokyo and Narita Airport is between 55 minutes and an hour. All seats are reserved, with both Standard and Green (first class) accommodation available.

Fares
As of June 28, 2021, regular adult fare for a Narita–Tokyo round trip is ¥6,140.  A special ¥4,070 fare is available to passengers with a foreign passport.

Formations
As of March 2012, services operate as twelve-car formations, as shown below, with car 1 at the Shinjuku/Yokohama end, and car 12 at the Narita Airport end. All cars are reserved, with Green (first class) car accommodation in cars 6 and 12.

Interior
Green (first class) cars have leather-covered forward-facing rotating/reclining seats arranged in 2+2 abreast configuration.

History

Until 1991, rail service to Narita Airport was limited to the Keisei Skyliner, which at the time used a station separated from the terminal complex. JR had initially planned to run a high-speed line, the Narita Shinkansen, to a station underneath the main airport terminal. This plan was abandoned in the 1980s, and the space originally slated for the underground station and Shinkansen tracks was used to connect both the JR Narita Line and Keisei Main Line directly to the terminal. The Narita Express began service to the new station on 19 March 1991, and Skyliner switched its service to the new station at the same time.

Until March 2004, the Wing Express limited express service was introduced to complement the Narita Express with one return working a day between Ōmiya/Ikebukuro/Shinjuku and Narita Airport. This service was subsequently replaced by an additional Narita Express service.

From the start of the revised timetable on 10 December 2005, Narita Express services were made entirely no-smoking.

On 1 October 2009, nine new E259 series EMU trains were brought into service on 10 of 26 return Narita Express services, replacing the 253 series. By June 2010 all Narita Express trains were operated by E259 series equipment.

From the start of the revised timetable on 13 March 2010, Narita Express service frequencies were increased with more splitting and combining of trains at Tokyo Station. Service is provided between Narita Airport and Tokyo, Shinjuku and Yokohama every 30 minutes during most of the day.

Narita Express services were suspended from 11 March 2011 due to the effects of the Great East Japan earthquake and tsunami and subsequent power supply shortage in the Tokyo area. They were partially restored from 4 April 2011, with the remaining pre-earthquake and tsunami timetable and services finally re-instated on 3 September 2011.

Starting in 2014 the Narita Express offered seasonal services on some routes. The services to Yokosuka station were discontinued in January 2017 due to low travel numbers, while in March 2019 the Kawaguchiko services were replaced by the new, daily Fuji Excursion limited express.

Due a reduction in international travel caused by the COVID-19 pandemic, on 1 May 2020 service was reduced to a few trains running in the morning and evening. All services resumed on 1 October 2022 prior to Japan lifting its entry restrictions for foreign travelers.

See also
 List of named passenger trains of Japan

References

External links

About N'EX (JR East)
E259 series Narita Express (JR East) 

1991 establishments in Japan
Airport rail links in Japan
East Japan Railway Company
Named passenger trains of Japan
Narita International Airport
Rail transport in Tokyo
Rail transport in Chiba Prefecture
Railway lines in Kanagawa Prefecture
Railway services introduced in 1991